The State Prize of Ukraine in Science and Technology is an annual award given by the President of Ukraine for accomplishments in science and technology. It is given for one of four categories: outstanding scientific research in the humanities, social, or natural sciences; development of new equipment, technologies, or methods of disease prevention; the solution of environment problems or invention of new environmental conservation techniques; or textbooks or new vocational techniques. It is the highest award given by The Government of Ukraine for accomplishments in science and technology. Recipients are called Laureates of the State Prize of Ukraine in the field of science and technology.

History
The State Prize of Ukraine in Science and Technology was established by the Council of Ministers of the Ukrainian SSR in 1969. Winners have been named every year since then (see the list of winners in Ukrainian). The prize is often given to groups of researchers for joint work on one project, and applicants will often apply as a team organised around one shared project, such as a book that they coauthored. In 2016, Petro Poroshenko set the number of state prizes awarded annually at a maximum of 15, with no more than 8 of the prizes being awarded to coauthors on a given project. The prize is accompanied by a monetary award. The composition of the committee that decides the award is directly set by the President of Ukraine; in 2015, it was set at 70 people, and chaired by figures in the National Academy of Sciences of Ukraine and the Ministry of Education and Science of Ukraine. The committee contains members from diverse disciplines including natural science, social sciences, law, humanities, agriculture, and machining.

Description
The award is given by the National Academy of Educational Sciences of Ukraine, and awardees are selected by the President of Ukraine. The recipients of the award are announced each year by presidential decree.

The prize is one of the orders, decorations, and medals of Ukraine, which are described by the Government of Ukraine as "the highest form of recognition of citizens for outstanding services in the development of economy, science, culture, social sphere, defense of the Fatherland, protection of constitutional human rights and freedoms, state building and public activity". In full, the award is given for: Humanities, natural and technical sciences, positively influencing the social progress and maintaining the recognition of the national science in the world; for the development and introduction of new techniques, materials and technologies, new ways and methods of treatment and prevention of diseases that meet the level of the world advances; for works that constitute a significant contribution to solving problems of environmental protection and ensuring ecological safety; creation of textbooks meeting the contemporary requirements and encouraging effective knowledge acquisition, and essentially influencing the improvement of future specialists' training.

Laureates

References

Awards established in 1969
Civil awards and decorations of Ukraine
State Prizes of Ukraine
Laureates of the State Prize of Ukraine in Science and Technology